The Army High Command (ACE) of Brazil is formed by the Army Commander and other army generals in active service. The country current have sixteen active 4-star generals, several of then in command posts, in addition to a post in the Ministry of Defence. The mission of ACE include the selection of a list of candidates to the post of commander, the prospection of regional and global political situations, among others roles. All Brazilian generals are graduates of the Brazilian Superior War School.

Organization of the Army High Command

The current posts of active Brazilian generals:

See also

 Future of the Brazilian Army

External links
 Brazilian Army General Staff
 Brazilian Ministry of Defense

References

Ministry of Defence (Brazil)
Brazil
Brazilian Army